Kim Chen (born 11 May 1967) is a Taiwanese breaststroke and medley swimmer. She competed in five events at the 1988 Summer Olympics. At the time, she was a student at the University of California, Berkeley, where she was a member of the California Golden Bears women's swim team.

References

External links
 
Photo of Chen (far right) with teammates Lin Kuo-wei, Lin Kuo-chung, and Sabrina Lum in Taipei, 10 June 1988, by Central News Agency, via Ministry of Culture

1967 births
Living people
California Golden Bears women's swimmers
Taiwanese female breaststroke swimmers
Taiwanese female medley swimmers
Olympic swimmers of Taiwan
Swimmers at the 1988 Summer Olympics
Place of birth missing (living people)